Sergiu Litvinenco (born 11 July 1981) is a Moldovan politician. He served as Minister of Justice from August 2021 to February 2023 in the cabinet of Prime Minister Natalia Gavrilița. He is married to Inga Iovu-Litvinenco, the daughter of the controversial accountant from Victoria Banc who is featured in the bank fraud case named - "theft of the billion file". Iovu and Litvinenco have two daughters.

References 

Living people
Place of birth missing (living people)
Moldovan Ministers of Justice
21st-century Moldovan politicians
1981 births